The Acacus Mountains or Tadrart Akakus ( / ALA-LC: Tadrārt Akākūs) form a mountain range in the desert of the Ghat District in western Libya, part of the Sahara. The area has a particularly rich array of prehistoric rock art.

History

Etymology
Tadrart is the feminine form of "mountain" in the Berber languages (masculine: adrar).

Rock art
The area is known for its rock art and was inscribed as a UNESCO World Heritage Site in 1985 because of the importance of these paintings and carvings. The paintings date from 12,000 BCE to 100 CE and reflect cultural and natural changes in the area.

There are paintings and carvings of animals such as giraffes, elephants, ostriches and camels, but also of humans and horses. People are depicted in various daily life situations, for example while making music and dancing.

Milk lipids
Tadrart Acacus is also the site of the earliest appearance of processed milk lipids on ceramics, which have been radiocarbon-dated to 7,500 BP.

Vandalism and destruction since 1969
During Muammar Gaddafi’s rule from 1969 through 2011, the Department of Antiquities was badly neglected. Since 2005, the search for petroleum hidden underground has placed the rock art itself in danger. Seismic hammers are used to send shock waves underneath to locate oil deposits, and have noticeable effects on nearby rocks, including the ones that house the Tadrart Acacus rock art.

Looting of ancient artifacts reached a level of crisis. In response UNESCO called for a major awareness campaign, to heighten awareness of Libya's archaeological and cultural heritage and to alert Libyans that their heritage is "being looted by thieves and destroyed by developers."

In 2012 following the murder of Gaddafi, efforts were made to train staff through a $2.26 million UNESCO project, with the Libyan and Italian governments. The project included conservation, protection and education. Along with Tadrart Acacus, Libya has four other UNESCO World Heritage sites: Cyrene, Leptis Magna, Sabratha and Ghadames. UNESCO advised that "a centre should be established at Ghat or Uweynat to train the staff in charge of the protection and management of the property and to host a museum which is expected to play an important [role] in terms of awareness raising."

UNESCO State of Conservation (SOC) reports from 2011, 2012 and 2013 show that at least ten of the rock-art sites have been the object of deliberate and considerable destruction since at least April 2009. The ambiguity surrounding property boundaries of the World Heritage Site and therefore the property management combined with lack of local understanding of its cultural values were contributing factors in the ongoing vandalism. Conflicts in the area since 2011 led to increased vandalism.

In May 2013 UNESCO undertook a technical mission to assess the state of conservation the Tadrart Acacus site and to "build-up a strategic plan to enforce the protection and management of this unique cultural and natural context."

On 14 April 2014 two kinds of vandals were reported, those who thoughtlessly carve their own names beside the ancient rock art and those who deliberately use chemical products to remove the rock drawings. On April 20, 2014, the French special correspondent  was informed by a local journalist from Ghat, Libya, Aziz Al-Hachi, that the UNESCO Rock-Art World Heritage Site of Tadrart Acacus was being destroyed with sledgehammers and scrub brushes.

Geography
The Tadrart Acacus have a large variation of landscapes, from different-coloured dunes to arches, gorges, isolated rocks and deep wadis (ravines). Major landmarks include the arches of Afzejare and Tin Khlega. Although this area is one of the most arid in the Sahara, there is vegetation, such as the medicinal Calotropis procera, and there are a number of springs and wells in the mountains.

See also
 List of Stone Age art
 Uan Muhuggiag

Notes

Further reading
 Di Lernia, Savino e Zampetti, Daniela (eds.) (2008) La Memoria dell'Arte. Le pitture rupestri dell'Acacus tra passato e futuro, Florence, All'Insegna del Giglio;
 Minozzi S., Manzi G., Ricci F., di Lernia S., and Borgognini Tarli S.M. (2003) "Nonalimentary tooth use in prehistory: an Example from Early Holocene in Central Sahara (Uan Muhuggiag, Tadrart Acacus, Libya)" American Journal of Physical Anthropology 120: pp. 225–232; 
 Mattingly, D. (2000) "Twelve thousand years of human adaptation in Fezzan (Libyan Sahara)" in G. Barker, Graeme and Gilbertson, D.D. (eds) The Archaeology of Drylands: Living at the Margin London, Routledge, pp. 160–79;
 Cremaschi, Mauro and Di Lernia, Savino (1999) "Holocene Climatic Changes and Cultural Dynamics in the Libyan Sahara" African Archaeological Review 16(4): pp. 211–238; 
 Cremaschi, Mauro; Di Lernia, Savino; and Garcea, Elena A. A. (1998) "Some Insights on the Aterian in the Libyan Sahara: Chronology, Environment, and Archaeology" African Archaeological Review 15(4): pp. 261–286; 
 Cremaschi, Mauro and Di Lernia, Savino (eds., 1998) Wadi Teshuinat: Palaeoenvironment and Prehistory in South-western Fezzan (Libyan Sahara) Florence, All'Insegna del Giglio;
 Wasylikowa, K. (1992) "Holocene flora of the Tadrart Acacus area, SW Libya, based on plant macrofossils from Uan Muhuggiag and Ti-n-Torha Two Caves archaeological sites" Origini 16: pp. 125–159;
 Mori, F., (1960) Arte Preistorica del Sahara Libico Rome, De Luca;
 Mori, F., (1965) Tadrart Acacus, Turin, Einaudi;
 Mercuri AM (2008) Plant exploitation and ethnopalynological evidence from the Wadi Teshuinat area (Tadrart Acacus, Libyan Sahara). Journal of Archaeological Science 35: 1619-1642; 
 Mercuri AM (2008) Human influence, plant landscape evolution and climate inferences from the archaeobotanical records of the Wadi Teshuinat area (Libyan Sahara). Journal of Arid Environments 72: 1950-1967.

External links

 UNESCO Fact Sheet
 Italian-Libyan Archaeological Mission in the Acacus and Messak
 Natural Arches of the Akakus Plateau

Mountain ranges of Libya
Archaeological sites in Libya
Saharan rock art
Deserts of Libya
Sahara
Prehistoric Africa
Ghat, Libya
Fezzan
Tuareg
World Heritage Sites in Libya
Tourism in Libya